The voiceless dental non-sibilant affricate is a type of consonantal sound used in some spoken languages.

Features
Features of the voiceless dental non-sibilant affricate:

Occurrence

See also
 Index of phonetics articles

Notes

References

External links
 

Dental consonants
Affricates
Pulmonic consonants
Voiceless oral consonants
Central consonants